Tati African Football Independent Club also known as TAFIC for short, is a football club based in Francistown, Botswana. The team was relegated from the Botswana Premier League to the First Division North in 2014. Nicknamed Matjimenyenga, after a stream, which runs behind the low-income locations of Maipaafela and Kgaphamadi. The club motto: "Undipe ndi kupe". The club was founded as in 1959 as a break away from the then popular TAFA football club. Information has it that the founders of TAFIC, which was initially known as Sharp Shooters in its formative years, were based at Kgaphamadi. 
They gained promotion back to the elite league as champions in the 2016/17 season but were subsequently relegated the very next season. They are currently playing in the Botswana Premier League.

Honours
 Botswana FA Challenge Cup 2002
Debswana First Division North League (FDN) 2016/17

Performance in CAF competitions
 African Cup Winners' Cup
 1993 – Preliminary Round

References

Association football clubs established in 1959
Football clubs in Francistown
1959 establishments in Bechuanaland Protectorate